Dương Bích Liên (17 July 1924 – 12 December 1988) was a Vietnamese painter. He is reported to have drunk himself to death.  He was a posthumous recipient of the Ho Chi Minh Prize in 2000.

Works
Some of his works are in the Vietnam National Museum of Fine Arts, Hanoi.

References

1924 births
1988 deaths
20th-century Vietnamese painters